EMLV (Ecole de Management Léonard De Vinci) – the Leonard de Vinci Business School Paris-La Defense – is a business school in Paris located at the Pôle universitaire Léonard-de-Vinci in La Defense, the main business district of Paris. It delivers a 5-year program and is accredited by the French government and recognized at the European level by ENQA.  The Pôle Universitaire Léonard De Vinci campus also includes a school of engineering (ESILV) and an international school of multimedia (IIM).

Programmes

Master in Management 

The MiM (Grande Ecole Programme) is EFMD-Master accredited and geared towards fresh graduates and young professionals wishing to enhance their career in business.

MBA 

EMLV MBA  is an intensive 1-year programme distinguished by AMBA accreditation, the highest standard of achievement in higher education earned only by the most prestigious programmes at worldwide level.

MSc Supply Chain Management 

The MSc Supply Chain Management is a 1-year programme and aims to develop advanced technical skills and places value on the Corporate Social Responsibility (CSR) principals and latest engineering industrial trends taught at ESILV.

MSc Digital Business Analytics 

The MSc Digital Business Analytics explores the various applications of data in our daily life. Societies and economies across the world require specialists in the use of digital analytics to improve the states of businesses.

MSc International Business  

The MSc International Business educates students in best business practices in an international business environment.

MSc International Finance & Asset Management 

The MSc International Finance & Asset Management will provide students with practical expertise in key domains of finance, a fast-paced environment in constant evolution.

Leadership
Pascal Brouaye is the director of the university.  The director of the Management School is Sebastien Tran.

The founder is Charles Pasqua, who organized the university in 1995.

International orientation and partner universities

The EMLV program places an emphasis on student exposure to real case studies with businesses by providing consulting services to the school's business partners. With more than 100 international partners welcoming its students in exchange programs, students are also encouraged to study abroad to enhance their cross-cultural understanding and linguistic skills.

Selected partner universities
 University of Malaga
 Vilnius University
 MCI Management Center Innsbruck
 University of Genova
 London South Bank University
 Coventry University
 Long Island University
 State University of New York at Old Westbury
 University of Quebec (UQAC)
 British Columbia Institute of Technology, Vancouver
 Beijing Jiaotong University

Placement
The graduates of EMLV work in all the major sectors, including:
 Auditing and consulting (20%)
 Finance, insurance, and financial management (25%)
 Luxury goods (8%)
 Press, media, and communication – including new media (23%)
 International business, export, and sales (24%)

2018 murder of Professor Dowling
Professor John Dowling was stabbed after class 13 times by a former management student for "insulting Islam".  The suspect had enrolled in the Management School in 2016.  Frédérique Vidal, France's Minister of Higher Education, declared "indignation" because of the killing.

References

External links
 Official web site

Universities and colleges in Paris
Business schools in France